Yonathan Emanuel Cabral (born 10 May 1992) is an Argentine professional footballer who plays as a centre-back for Argentine Primera División club Lanús, on loan from Atlético Tucumán.

Career 

Yonathan came in lower than Racing Club. Was concentrated first when club coach, Reinaldo Merlo had no variants to replace the defender holder . Made his professional debut on March 22, 2014 in the win 2-0 on Belgrano de Córdoba. On December 14 of that year is devoted champion with Racing after 13 years. The May 2, 2015 marks his first professional goal against Lanus.

Honours
Racing Club
Argentine Primera División (1): 2014

References

External links

 

1992 births
Living people
Footballers from Buenos Aires
Argentine footballers
Association football defenders
Racing Club de Avellaneda footballers
Olimpo footballers
Atlético Tucumán footballers
Newell's Old Boys footballers
Club Atlético Lanús footballers
Argentine Primera División players